The women's 800 metres event at the 2015 Summer Universiade was held on 8, 9 and 10 July at the Gwangju Universiade Main Stadium.

Medalists

Results

Heats
Qualification: First 3 in each heat (Q) and next 4 fastest (q) qualified for the semifinals.

Semifinals
Qualification: First 3 in each heat (Q) and the next 2 fastest (q) qualified for the final.

Final

References

800
2015 in women's athletics
2015